Pseudopangonia is a genus of horse flies in the family Tabanidae.

Distribution
New South Wales.

Species
Pseudopangonia australis Ricardo, 1915

References

Brachycera genera
Tabanidae
Diptera of Australasia